Athis-Mons is a commune in the southern suburbs of Paris, France.

Inhabitants are called Athégiens.

A small part of Orly International Airport lies on the territory of the commune of Athis-Mons.

History
Athis-Mons was formed in 1817 by joining two villages, Athis (along the Seine, and formerly known as Athis-sur-Orge) and Mons (on the adjacent plateau). Nowadays the lower area of the commune is commonly called Athis-Val.

During World War II, a significant portion (approximately 80%) of Athis-Mons was destroyed during the Allied bombing raid of 18 April 1944. Approximately 300 people died and 4,000 people were left homeless. Athis-Mons had to be entirely rebuilt after the war.

Population

Geography
Athis-Mons is located at the confluence of Orge and Seine rivers, and at the southern edge of the international airport of Orly.

Climate

Athis-Mons has a oceanic climate (Köppen climate classification Cfb).

Administration
The canton of Athis-Mons has 2 communes (the other is Paray-Vieille-Poste) and 36,615 inhabitants. Athis-Mons is a twin town of Ballina in Ireland.

Transport
Athis-Mons is served by Athis-Mons station on Paris RER line C.

Education
The commune has nine preschools (écoles maternelles) and eight elementary schools (écoles élémentaires).
 Preschools: Albert Calmette, Jules Ferry, Jean de la Fontaine, Pauline Kergomard, La Rougette, Charles Perrault, Jacques Prévert, Antoine de Saint-Exupéry, 
 Elementary schools: Édouard Branly, Pierre et Marie Curie, Jules Ferry, Camille Flammarion, Jean Jaurès, Louis Pasteur, Antoine de Saint-Exupéry
 Combined preschools and elementary schools: Jean-Baptiste de la Salle

There is a private Catholic school, .

Museum 
The city hosts the aviation museum Musée Delta.

Twin towns - sister cities
Athis-Mons is twinned with:
 Ballina, Ireland
 Rothenburg ob der Tauber, Germany
 Sinaia, Romania

See also
Communes of the Essonne department

References

External links

Official website 

Communes of Essonne